Rayburn Township is a township in Armstrong County, Pennsylvania, United States. The population was 1,766 at the 2020 census, a decrease from the figure of 1,907 tabulated in 2010.

Geography
Rayburn Township is located in central Armstrong County and is bordered to the west by the Allegheny River and the borough of Kittanning, the county seat. Cowanshannock Creek flows through the township into the Allegheny River.

Demographics

As of the census of 2000, there were 1,811 people, 694 households, and 526 families residing in the township.  The population density was 152.4 people per square mile (58.8/km2).  There were 737 housing units at an average density of 62.0/sq mi (23.9/km2).  The racial makeup of the township was 99.06% White, 0.33% African American, 0.28% from other races, and 0.33% from two or more races. Hispanic or Latino of any race were 0.61% of the population.

There were 694 households, out of which 36.5% had children under the age of 18 living with them, 64.8% were married couples living together, 8.1% had a female householder with no husband present, and 24.2% were non-families. 20.3% of all households were made up of individuals, and 10.7% had someone living alone who was 65 years of age or older.  The average household size was 2.57 and the average family size was 2.97.

The township median age of 38 years was less than that of the county median age of 40 years. The distribution by age group was 25.7% under the age of 18, 6.9% from 18 to 24, 28.5% from 25 to 44, 24.0% from 45 to 64, and 14.8% who were 65 years of age or older.  The median age was 38 years. For every 100 females there were 96.2 males.  For every 100 females age 18 and over, there were 91.1 males.

The median income for a household in the township was $29,830, and the median income for a family was $33,276. Males had a median income of $30,139 versus $20,433 for females. The per capita income for the township was $14,490.  About 13.9% of families and 17.1% of the population were below the poverty line, including 25.3% of those under age 18 and 10.0% of those age 65 or over.

Cemeteries
County Home Cemetery
Kittanning Cemetery
Pine Creek Baptist Church Cemetery
Saint Joseph Cemetery
Saint Marys Cemetery

References

Populated places established in 1784
Townships in Armstrong County, Pennsylvania